Aliparamba  is a village in Malappuram district in the state of Kerala, India.

Demographics
 India census, Aliparamba had a population of 22802 with 11027 males and 11775 females.

Transportation
Aliparamba village connects to other parts of India through Perinthalmanna town.  National highway No.66 passes through Tirur and the northern stretch connects to Goa and Mumbai.  The southern stretch connects to Cochin and Trivandrum.   Highway No.966 goes to Palakkad and Coimbatore.   The nearest airport is at Kozhikode.  The nearest major railway station is at Shoranur.For local trains - Angadipuram Railway station is an option.

References

Villages in Malappuram district
Perinthalmanna area

Location